In basketball, points are used to keep track of the score in a game. Points can be accumulated by making field goals (worth two points from within the three-point line or three points from beyond the three-point line) or free throws (worth one point). The team that records the most points at the end of a game is declared the game's winner. If the game is still tied at the end of regulation play, additional overtime period(s) are played in order to determine the winner.

In the years following the founding of the National Basketball Association (NBA) in 1946, teams only averaged around 80 points per game. Before the introduction of the shot clock, teams often ran out the clock by passing the ball more frequently after having established a lead in a game. If one team did choose to stall, the opposing team (especially if behind) would often commit fouls to regain possession. This resulted in very low-scoring games with excessive fouls, which negatively affected attendance. Beginning in the 1954–55 season, the NBA implemented a 24-second shot clock, the aim of which was to speed up the game and create a more entertaining experience for those in attendance. If the offensive team failed to hit the rim with the ball within the allotted 24 seconds, they would lose possession. This innovation resulted in higher average scores. Consequently, all of the highest-scoring games in the NBA have happened during the shot-clock era.

Summary
The highest-scoring regular-season game in NBA history is the triple-overtime game between the Detroit Pistons and the Denver Nuggets on December 13, 1983. The two teams combined to score 370 points, with the Pistons defeating the Nuggets 186–184. An NBA-record four players scored over 40 points in the game, including the Nuggets' Kiki Vandeweghe with a game-high 51. The two teams also set several other NBA records, including the most points scored by one team (186 points), the most points scored by a losing team (184), the most field goals by two teams (142), most field goals by one team (74) and most assists by two teams (93).

The highest-scoring regular season game in regulation was between the Golden State Warriors and the Denver Nuggets on November 2, 1990. In that game, Golden State defeated Denver 162–158. The Warriors' Chris Mullin scored a game-high 38 points. The Nuggets were coached by Doug Moe from 1980 to 1990 and Paul Westhead from 1990 to 1992, both of whom employed a run-and-gun offensive strategy, which focuses on attempting a high number of field goals while also conceding a large number of points on defense. In fact, Moe's and Westhead's Nuggets were participants in four of the ten highest-scoring regular season games in NBA history. The Warriors were coached by Don Nelson from 1988 to 1995 and 2006 to 2010. He employed Nellie Ball, a style of run and gun that uses smaller, more athletic players to outrun opponents. Another notable high-scoring regular season game is a March 2, 1962, game between the Philadelphia Warriors and the New York Knicks. In that game, the Warriors' Wilt Chamberlain scored an NBA-record 100 points.

The highest-scoring playoff game is the double-overtime game between the Portland Trail Blazers and the Phoenix Suns on May 11, 1992. The two teams combined to score 304 points, with the Trail Blazers defeating the Suns 153–151. The Suns' Kevin Johnson scored a game-high 35 points, with 12 other players also scoring in double figures. The highest-scoring playoff game in regulation occurred when the San Antonio Spurs defeated the Denver Nuggets with a score of 152–133 for a combined score of 285 points on April 26, 1983. In that game, the Spurs' George Gervin scored a game-high 42 points.

Most of the highest-scoring games happened before the 1995–96 season, when the average scoring (points per game) per team was always in the 100s. Until the emergence of small ball in 2013, the average had dropped down to the 90s. From 1995 though 2012, only two games made the top-ten lists of both the regular season and playoffs: a May 10, 2003, game between the Dallas Mavericks and the Sacramento Kings and a December 7, 2006, game between the Phoenix Suns and New Jersey Nets. Both the Mavericks and the Suns were coached by Nelson and Mike D'Antoni respectively, both of whom also made use of the run-and-gun style. The 2018–19 season saw an entry into this list with a quadruple-overtime game between the Chicago Bulls and Atlanta Hawks. The 2022–23 season then saw an entry into this list with the second-highest scoring game in history, a double-overtime game between the Los Angeles Clippers and Sacramento Kings.

List

Highest-scoring regular season games

Highest-scoring playoff games

See also

Notes

References
General

 
 
 

Specific

Highest-scoring games
Scoring (basketball)
Highest-scoring sports matches